Bi Nahr-e Sofla (also Romanized as Bī Nahr-e Soflá; also known as Bīnahr-e Soflá) is a village in Qalkhani Rural District, Gahvareh District, Dalahu County, Kermanshah Province, Iran. At the 2006 census, its population was 107, in 25 families.

References 

Populated places in Dalahu County